The Montreal Bleu Blanc Rouge (Blue, White and Red in English) were a junior ice hockey team in the Quebec Major Junior Hockey League from 1972 to 1975. They played at the Montreal Forum in Montreal, Quebec, Canada.

History
The Montreal Bleu Blanc Rouge were the result of several years of disputes between the Quebec Major Junior Hockey League and the Ontario Hockey Association (OHA). In 1972 the QMJHL threatened a lawsuit to force the Montreal Junior Canadiens to return to the Quebec-based league, after departing in 1961 for the OHA.

Over the summer of 1972, the Junior Canadiens ownership were granted  "one-year suspension" of operations by the OHA. The QMJHL then allowed team ownership to transfer the team and its players into the QMJHL for the 1972-73 season. To avoid litigation from the OHA by using the Junior Canadiens name, the team was renamed Montreal Bleu Blanc Rouge. Neither the team nor any of its players would return to the OHA, while the "suspended" franchise was reactivated by the OHA for the 1973-74 season as the Kingston Canadians.

The Bleu Blanc Rouge played for three seasons in the shadow of the Montreal Canadiens, before being renamed Montreal Juniors.

Players
Norm Dupont is the all-time points leader for the Montreal Bleu Blanc Rouge. He played 142 games, scoring 139 goals and 144 assists, totalling 283 points. Jean-Luc Phaneuf is a close 2nd place. In 187 games he scored 104 goals and 172 assists for 276 points, but was deemed to be  too small to play in the NHL. Nonetheless, the Bleu Blanc Rouge graduated 16 players to the NHL in only 3 years of play.

Award winners

Jean Béliveau Trophy(Top Scorer)
1974-75 Normand Dupont

Frank J. Selke Commemorative Trophy(Most Sportsmanlike Player)
1974-75 Jean-Luc Phaneuf

NHL alumni

Yearly results

Regular season

Playoffs
1972-1973 Lost to Cornwall Royals 4 games to 0 in quarter-finals.
1973-1974 Defeated Sherbrooke Castors 4 games to 1 in quarter-finals. Lost to Sorel Eperviers 4 games to 0 in semi-finals.
1974-1975 Defeated Cornwall Royals 4 games to 0 in quarter-finals. Lost to Laval National 4 games to 1 in semi-finals.

References

1972 establishments in Quebec
1975 disestablishments in Quebec
Defunct Quebec Major Junior Hockey League teams
Ice hockey clubs established in 1972
Ice hockey clubs disestablished in 1975
Ble